Your Name Poisons My Dreams  is a 1996 Spanish thriller film directed by Pilar Miró consisting of an adaptation of the novel Tu nombre envenena mis sueños by Joaquín Leguina. It stars Carmelo Gómez and Emma Suárez alongside Ángel de Andrés, Anabel Alonso and Toni Cantó.

Plot 
The fiction, starting in 1942, is primarily set in post-Civil War, Francoist Madrid (1940s), focusing on the case pertaining the  killings of some Falangists, conveyed from the point of view of inspector Ángel Barciela, the policeman taking over the investigation; there are however another two timelines corresponding to the 1950s, and to the actual war period.

Cast

Production 
A film adaptation of Joaquín Leguina's novel Tu nombre envenena mis sueños, the screenplay was penned by Ricardo Franco and Pilar Miró. The film was produced by Sogetel/Central de Producciones Audiovisuales and it had the participation of Sogepaq and Canal Plus. Rafael Díaz-Salgado, José Luis Olaizola and Fernando de Garcillán were credited as producers.

Release 
The film was presented at the 44th San Sebastián International Film Festival in September 1996, the same year as The Dog in the Manger, another film directed by Miró, who would die about a year later. Distributed by UIP, it opened in Spanish theatres on 27 September 1996.

Reception 
David Rooney of Variety deemed the film to be a "mediocre period detective thriller", "more sleep-inducing than intoxicating".
 
Augusto Martínez Torres of El País considered that the story would have probably been more interesting if it had focused on developing the (richer) personality of the woman, rather than on the point of view of the man.

See also 
 List of Spanish films of 1996

References

Bibliography 
 
 
 
 
 

Films set in the 1940s
Films set in Spain
Spanish thriller films
1996 thriller films
Spanish films about revenge
Films set in Madrid
1990s Spanish-language films
Films based on Spanish novels
1990s Spanish films